Big Tom and The Mainliners were a Country and Irish showband from the Castleblayney area of County Monaghan, Ireland.

Timeline

1966–1975
Originally named as "The Mighty Mainliners Showband", the band achieved fame after appearing on RTÉ Television's Showband Show broadcast on 21 May 1966 performing Gentle Mother which subsequently reached number 7 in the pop charts of Ireland. In the early 1970s, the band changed their name to "The Mainliners", however soon afterwards they adopted the name "Big Tom and the Mainliners" in line with other Irish Showbands where a single man was used to take centre stage.

Original line up 1966
 "Big" Tom McBride – lead vocals, saxophone, rhythm guitar
 Seamus McMahon – lead guitar, fiddle, vocals
 Henry McMahon – tenor sax, vocals, bandleader, percussion
 John Beattie – keyboards, piano
 Cyril McKevitt – trombone, vocals
 Ronnie Duffy – drums, vocals
 Ginger Morgan – Bass guitar, vocals

Irish Top Ten Songs

1975–1998
In May 1975, lead vocalist Tom McBride (known as "Big Tom") left the band and formed a new band "Big Tom and the Travellers" under the management of Top Rank Entertainment (owned by country music tycoon Tony Loughman). The band subsequently used other lead vocalists, including John Glenn, Tom Allen and Jan Lynch, and occasionally performed without a front man. Big Tom would rejoin the band in 1989 and they continued to play and record regularly until 1998.

1999–2018
Due to their advancing years the band have only had occasional 'comeback' tours. They have toured more regularly in the last 4 years with the original band playing together.

In 2004, Big Tom’s son Dermot McBride took Ginger Morgan's place on Bass Guitar, Peter McCarthy took Ronnie Duffy's place on drums and Robert Browne, a second keyboardist in the band, appeared to take Cyril McKevitt's place on Trombone (however both were performing for the band in their Q4 2005 tour). In 2005, the band recorded a hit single The Same Way You Came In. In November 2006, McBride suffered a sudden heart attack, jeopardising plans for future tours, however doctors later gave the all clear for him to have a mini tour of Ireland in February, 2008. It is believed that the band will revert to the seven original Mainliners for this tour. Cyril McKevitt died of a heart attack, on Tuesday 15 September 2009, just days after the end of the band's Summer 2009 tour. Martin Campbell filled McKevitt's position one year later.
Since 2014 the band continue to tour on a regular basis including 8 dates in 2015–16

Big Tom died on 17 April 2018.

Last line up (2009–2018)
 Big Tom – lead vocals, rhythm guitar
 Seamus McMahon – lead guitar, rhythm guitar, fiddle, vocals
 Henry McMahon – bandleader, tenor sax, vocals, percussion
 John Beattie – keyboards, piano
 Martin Campbell – trombone, vocals
 Ronnie Duffy – drums, vocals
 Ginger Morgan – bass guitar, vocals
 Harry Conlon – Organ

References

Castleblayney
Irish country music groups
Musical groups established in 1966
Musical groups disestablished in 2018
1966 establishments in Ireland
2018 disestablishments in Ireland
Musical groups from County Monaghan